George Odum (born November 3, 1993) is an American football safety and special teamer for the San Francisco 49ers of the National Football League (NFL). He played college football at Central Arkansas before signing with the Indianapolis Colts as an undrafted free agent in 2018. Odum was named to the 2020 and 2022 All-Pro Team for his special team play.

Early life and high school
Odum was born and raised in Millington, Tennessee and attended Millington Central High School, where he was a star athlete both in football and track. As a senior, he was an All-Region selection at defensive back and punt returner and participated in the 2012 Tennessee vs. Kentucky National Guard and AutoZone Liberty Bowl All-Star Games.

College career
Odum played five seasons for the Bears, redshirting his true freshman season. He played both linebacker and safety and finished fourth in school history with 350 career tackles. He was named first-team All-Southland Conference after making 86 tackles (58 solo), 7.5 tackles for loss, 2.5 sacks, four passes defensed, one interception (returned for a touchdown), four forced fumbles, two fumble recoveries and two blocked kick. As a senior, Odum led the Bears in tackles and was named Southland Conference Defensive Player of the Year and a consensus All-America selection after recording 120 tackles (78 solo), 8.0 tackles for loss, 4.0 sacks, two passes defensed, and one forced fumble.

Professional career

Indianapolis Colts
Odum was signed by the Colts as an undrafted free agent on May 1, 2018 and made the team out of training camp. Odum made his NFL debut on September 9, 2018 against the Cincinnati Bengals, playing on special teams. Odum made his first career start on November 18, 2018 after an injury to safety Malik Hooker in a 38-10 win against the Tennessee Titans and made 6 tackles, including one for a loss. Odum recorded his first career interception by picking off a pass from Dallas Cowboys quarterback Dak Prescott in a 23-0 win on December 16, 2018. In his rookie season, Odum played in all 16 games for the Colts (two starts) with 36 total tackles, including one for loss, an interception and two passes defended.

In 2019, Odum again played in all 16 of the Colts' games and recorded 37 tackles with two forced fumbles and a fumble recovery. Odum made one start during the season against the Kansas City Chiefs, making six tackles and forcing a fumble in a 19-13 victory.

Odum saw only 25 total snaps on defense in 2020, but led the NFL with 20 special teams tackles and was named first-team All-Pro as a special teamer. The Colts placed a restricted free agent tender on Odum on March 17, 2021. He signed the one-year contract on April 19.

In 2021, Odum saw more playing time on defensive due to injuries in the Colts' secondary. He started seven games and played 43% of the team's total defensive snaps during the season. Odum finished the year with 55 total tackles, two passes defended, and one interception with a forced fumble and a fumble recovery. Odum became an unrestricted free agent after the season ended.

San Francisco 49ers
On March 22, 2022, Odum signed a three-year contract with the San Francisco 49ers. 2022 was his second all pro year.

References

External links
San Francisco 49ers bio
Central Arkansas Bears bio

Living people
1993 births
People from Millington, Tennessee
Players of American football from Tennessee
African-American players of American football
American football safeties
Central Arkansas Bears football players
Indianapolis Colts players
San Francisco 49ers players
21st-century African-American sportspeople